Bruchez may refer to:

 Jules Bruchez American professional mixed martial arts (MMA) fighter
 Pierre Bruchez (b. 1985) is a Swiss ski mountaineer